Chaar Din Ki Chandni is a 2012 Hindi romantic comedy film directed and produced by Samir Karnik. The film stars Tusshar Kapoor and Kulraj Randhawa in the lead roles while Anupam Kher, Om Puri and Anita Raj appear in supporting roles. It released on 9 March 2012, received generally negative reviews.

Cast 
 Kulraj Randhawa as Chandni Singh
 Tusshar Kapoor as Veer Vikram Singh/Pappi Sardar
 Anupam Kher as Chandraveer Singh
 Om Puri as Fatoor Singh
 Mukul Dev as Udaybhan
 Johny Lever as Paan Singh
 Anita Raj as Devika
 Sushant Singh as Yashwant Singh
 Chandrachur Singh as Prithvi Singh
 Farida Jalal as Pammi Kaur
 Rahul Singh as Lt. Shaitan
Harish Kumar
 Shruti Sharma Divya

Production
Filming took place across Rajasthan and Amritsar in India.

Reception

Critical reception
Chaar Din Ki Chandni received generally negative reviews from critics. Taran Adarsh from Bollywood Hungama gave it 3/5 and added "A loud comedy that tries too hard to be funny and romantic,". Critic Rajeev Masand rated this film 0 out of 5, saying this is the worst film of 2012.

Soundtrack 

The song Chandni O Meri Chandni is a modern-day remixed version of the song of the same name from the film Chandni.

See also
 Bollywood films of 2012

References

External links 
 
 

2010s Hindi-language films
Indian romantic comedy films
2012 romantic comedy films
2012 films
Films scored by Shiv-Hari
Films scored by Abhishek Ray
Films scored by Dr Zeus
Films scored by Sandesh Shandilya
Films set in Rajasthan
Films scored by Sanjoy Chowdhury
Films shot in Rajasthan
Films directed by Samir Karnik